Bilot Sharif or Bilot is a town and union council of Dera Ismail Khan District in Khyber Pakhtunkhwa province of Pakistan. It is located at 32°15′20″N 71°9′41″E and has an altitude of 180 metres (593 feet).

Bilot is a popular tourist destination of a pre-Islamic era, about 55 km from the Dera Ismail Khan city on Chashma road. The ruins are situated on a hill and are easily viewable from main road. Bilot is also famous for a Sufi shrine, which is why it is called "Bilot Sharif".

See also 
 Lieutenant Thomas Watson, VC

References

Union councils of Dera Ismail Khan District	 
Populated places in Dera Ismail Khan District